Sell/Buy/Date is an 2022 American documentary-comedy-drama film, directed, written, and produced by Sarah Jones, from a story by Jones and David Goldblum, based upon her off-Broadway play of the same name. Meryl Streep serves as an executive producer.

It had its world premiere at South by Southwest on March 11, 2022. It is scheduled to be released on October 14, 2022, by Cinedigm.

Plot
The film follows Sarah Jones as she travels across the United States, navigating the sex industry's relationship with race, power, and economics. Jones additionally portrays four different characters, with Rosario Dawson, Bryan Cranston, Ilana Glazer, Evan Seinfeld, Lotus Lain, Terria Xo, Leslie Farrington, Alice Little, among others appearing in the film.

Production
In January 2021, it was announced Sarah Jones would direct, write, and produce, a documentary revolving around the sex industry, based on her Off-Broadway play of the same name, with Meryl Streep, Laverne Cox and Rashida Jones serving as executive producers. The announcement of the project drew significant backlash, from sex workers and rights activists. Cox and Jones later exited the project. Following the backlash, Jones throughout the film made sure to include sex workers of various backgrounds.

Release
The film had its world premiere at South by Southwest on March 11, 2022. In July 2022, Cinedigm acquired distribution rights to the film. It is scheduled to be released on October 14, 2022.

Reception
On the review aggregator website Rotten Tomatoes, the film has an approval rating of 88% based on 8 reviews, with an average rating of 9.00/10.

References

External links
 

2022 films
2022 documentary films
2022 comedy films
American comedy films
American documentary films
2022 directorial debut films
Documentaries about sexuality
Films scored by Jeff Beal